Scopula benguetensis  is a moth of the family Geometridae. It was described by Prout in 1931. It is found on the Philippines (Luzon).

References

Endemic fauna of the Philippines
Moths described in 1931
benguetensis
Taxa named by Louis Beethoven Prout
Moths of Asia